Roger Kasperson (March 29, 1938 – April 10, 2021) was an American risk analyst, a distinguished academic and professor at Clark University and was one of the proponents of risk perception studies with his work on The Social Amplification/Attentuation of Risk Framework (SARF).

He was born in Worcester, Massachusetts. Honored by the Association of American Geographers for his research on hazards, he also served on various committees of the U.S. National Research Council (a.k.a., National Science Foundation) as well as the council of the Society for Risk Analysis and was given the 2006 Distinguished Achievement Award of the SRA. He was an elected member of the National Academy of Sciences and served as executive director for the Stockholm Environment Institute 2000–2004.

See also
Clark University
Society for Risk Analysis

References

External links 
Clark University
Society for Risk Analysis

Members of the United States National Academy of Sciences
Fellows of the American Academy of Arts and Sciences
1938 births
2021 deaths
People from Worcester, Massachusetts
American geographers